Josef Hornauer (14 January 1908 – 12 December 1985) was a German international footballer. He was part of Germany's team at the 1928 Summer Olympics.

References

1908 births
1985 deaths
Footballers from Munich
Association football forwards
German footballers
Germany international footballers
Olympic footballers of Germany
Footballers at the 1928 Summer Olympics
TSV 1860 Munich players
1. FC Nürnberg players